Ivan Honchar Museum (National Centre of Folk Culture) is a museum in Kyiv, Ukraine showcasing the culture of Ukraine and preserving Ukrainian folk art. 

The museum was founded on a private collection of Ivan Makarovych Honchar shortly after his death in 1993. During the Soviet period, Ivan was accused of nationalism. Each individual showing an interest in his private collection was registered with the KGB.

The collection consists of over 15,000 items from the 16th to the early 20th centuries. A good example is a painting of the Ukrainian folklore hero Cossack Mamay. Other items include over 500 icons from the 16th century, 100 paintings by famous Ukrainian artists, an impressive collection of over 2,500 items of textiles from the 18th and 19th centuries, pottery, toys, Easter eggs, wood carvings and Ukrainian folk music instruments. Another part of the museum consists of Honchar's private library with books containing material that had the possessor sent to prison during Soviet times.

The Museum is a living institution, not only a collection of exhibits. There are folk art studios,  shops, a theatre of folk songs and folklore, Ukrainian cuisine hands-on classes and other courses.

The musician Oleh Skrypka, (frontman of Vopli Vidopliassova) each year organizes vechornytsi (gatherings) at the centre, which include folklore singing, dances, customs etc.

Gallery

References

External links
Ivan Honchar Museum within Google Arts & Culture

Art museums and galleries in Ukraine
Folk art museums and galleries
Institutions with the title of National in Ukraine